Mohammad Soltani Mehr; is an Iranian footballer who currently plays for Iranian football club Zob Ahan in the Persian Gulf Pro League and the Iran national under-20 football team. He has been mentioned by The Guardian among 60 of the best young talents in world football.

Club career

Saipa
He started his career with Pas Tehran academy. Later he joined Damash Tehran and Saipa academies. In summer 2015 he was promoted to Saipa first team by Majid Jalali. He made his debut for Saipa on 12 February 2016 against Sepahan as a substitute for Milad Meydavoudi, being only 17 years and 8 days old.

Club career statistics

International career

U17
He was part of Iran U–17 in 2014 AFC U-16 Championship.

U20
In 2016 he played in the AFC U-19 Championship held in Bahrain. Furthermore, he was invited to the Iran U–20 squad for the 2017 FIFA U-20 World Cup held in South Corea from 20 May until 11 June 2017. He played in all 3 matches of the group stage against Costa Rica, Zambia, and Portugal.

References

External links
 Mohammad Soltani Mehr at IranLeague.ir
 

1999 births
Living people
Iranian footballers
Saipa F.C. players
Shahin Bushehr F.C. players
Zob Ahan Esfahan F.C. players
Sportspeople from Tehran
Association football midfielders
Footballers at the 2018 Asian Games
Asian Games competitors for Iran